Kalanchoe luciae, the paddle plant, is a species of flowering plant in the genus Kalanchoe, native to northeast South Africa, Eswatini, Mozambique and Zimbabwe. It has gained the Royal Horticultural Society's Award of Garden Merit.

References

luciae
Plants described in 1908